Vijaya Raje Scindia (12 October 1919 – 25 January 2001), born Lekha Divyeshwari Devi in Nepal and known popularly as the Rajmata of Gwalior in India, was a prominent Indian political personality. In the days of the British Raj, as consort of the last ruling Maharaja of Gwalior, Jivajirao Scindia, she ranked among the highest royal figures of the land. In later life, she became a politician of considerable influence and was elected repeatedly to both houses of the Indian parliament. She was a member of the Bharatiya Janata Party.

Early years
Vijaya Raje Scindia was born in 1919 at Simraugadh in present-day Madhesh Pradesh, the eldest child of Thakur Mahendra Singh of Nepal, a government officer, by his second wife, Chuda Devashwari Devi. She was named Lekha Divyeshwari Devi at birth. Her father was a deputy collector in the provincial administration. Her mother was the daughter of former Commander-in-chief of the Nepalese Army Commanding-General Raja Khadga Shamsher Jang Bahadur Rana, the nephew of founder of Rana dynasty of Nepal, Jang Bahadur Kunwar Rana. She died at Vijaya Raje's birth. Her brother is Dhyanendra Singh, husband of Maya Singh.

Personal life
In February 1941, at the age of 22, Lekha was married to Jivajirao Scindia, Maharaja of Gwalior, one of the largest, richest and highest-ranking princely states in India.

Politics

Vijayaraje was initiated into electoral politics in 1957 when she contested and won the Guna Lok Sabha seat in Madhya Pradesh on a Congress ticket. Five years later, she won on a Congress ticket from Gwalior. Later, she quit the Congress and won the Guna seat in 1967 on Swatantra Party's ticket. She soon joined Bharatiya Jan Sangh and resigned from Lok Sabha to take part in state politics. She won the Karera assembly seat in Madhya Pradesh as the Jan Sangh candidate in 1967 and plunged headlong into state politics. Jan Sangh defied the Indira-wave in the 1971 Lok Sabha polls to win 3 seats in Gwalior region – Vijaya Raje Scindia from Bhind, Vajpayee from Gwalior and Madhavrao Scindia from Guna, though he later left the party. Vijayaraje Scindia did not contest Lok Sabha elections in 1977 and 1984 and lost to Indira Gandhi in Rae Bareli in 1980. In 1989, she won from Guna as member of Bharatiya Janata Party (BJP), and retained the seat in 1991, 1996 and 1998. She did not contest the elections in 1999 due to old age. She was jailed by Indira Gandhi during the Emergency, ultimately sharing a cell with fellow Rajmata and MP, Gayatri Devi, in Tihar Jail. In the 1970s, Vijayraje and her son Madhavrao were involved in a public dispute over property. Animosities heightened due to their differing political ideologies.

Vijayaraje came to the forefront of the BJP leadership in 1980 when she was made one of its vice-presidents. She played a key role in popularizing the party's Ram Janmabhoomi movement and was considered a hardliner. Following the demolition of the Babri Masjid in December 1992, she had declared that "she could now die without any regret, for she had seen her dream come true." She remained a BJP vice-president until 1998 when she stepped down on health grounds and quit electoral politics. She died in January 2001.

Ancestry

References

Further reading

Scindia, Vijayaraje, with Malgonkar, Manohar. The Last Maharani of Gwalior: An Autobiography, State University of New York Press, Albany (1987). 
Brief biography
From the Tribune newspaper

1919 births
2001 deaths
University of Lucknow alumni
Bharatiya Janata Party politicians from Madhya Pradesh
Vijayraje
Women in Madhya Pradesh politics
Queen mothers
Lok Sabha members from Madhya Pradesh
India MPs 1957–1962
India MPs 1962–1967
India MPs 1967–1970
India MPs 1971–1977
India MPs 1989–1991
India MPs 1991–1996
India MPs 1996–1997
India MPs 1998–1999
People from Sagar, Madhya Pradesh
Indian National Congress politicians from Madhya Pradesh
Swatantra Party politicians
Indians imprisoned during the Emergency (India)
Indian female royalty
Bharatiya Jana Sangh politicians
People from Guna district
Leaders of the Opposition in Madhya Pradesh
20th-century Indian women politicians
20th-century Indian politicians
Rajya Sabha members from Madhya Pradesh
People from Bhind district
Indian people of Nepalese descent
Women members of the Lok Sabha
Women members of the Rajya Sabha